The thirteenth series of the British medical drama television series Casualty commenced airing in the United Kingdom on BBC One on 5 September 1998 and finished on 13 March 1999. It saw another increase, this time to 28 episodes (the first two episodes aired on consecutive nights), including a feature-length Christmas episode. This was the first series to be broadcast in widescreen. The series also acted as a launchpad for characters and storylines in the spin-off series Holby City, which started in January 1999.

The series saw the arrival of several new characters including Max Gallagher and Sean Maddox, while Mark Grace left halfway through the series and George Woodman left at the end of it. Early in the series came the return of Lisa "Duffy" Duffin, last seen as a guest in the two-part conclusion of the previous season.

Cast

Overview
The thirteenth series of Casualty features a cast of characters working in the emergency department of Holby City Hospital. The series began with 10 roles with star billing, which was an increase from the previous series. Rebecca Lacey starred as senior house officer Georgina "George" Woodman. Derek Thompson continued his role as charge nurse Charlie Fairhead and Barbara Marten portrayed sister Eve Montgomery. Paterson Joseph appeared as senior staff nurse Mark Grace while Jonathan Kerrigan and Claire Goose starred as staff nurses Sam Colloby and Tina Seabrook. Ian Bleasdale and Donna Alexander continued their roles as paramedics Josh Griffiths and Penny Hutchens. Rebecca Wheatley portrayed receptionist Amy Howard.

Episode one featured four new cast members: Robert Gwilym (clinical director and emergency medicine consultant Max Gallagher); Gerald Kyd (senior house officer Sean Maddox); Jan Anderson (staff nurse Chloe Hill); and Pal Aron (bed manager Adam Osman). Susan Cookson also made her first appearance as recurring character, nurse Julie Day in episode one. Following a guest stint at the end of the previous series, Cathy Shipton reprised her role as original character Lisa "Duffy" Duffin in episode four. Duffy returned as an agency nurse, but was later invited to join the team as a senior staff nurse. Joseph decided to leave the series in 1998; Mark Grace departed in episode 18. Lacey also chose to leave the series and her character, George Woodman, left at the conclusion of the series.

This series set up several storylines and characters for the show's spin-off series, Holby City. Michael French and Nicola Stephenson guest appeared in episodes thirteen and seventeen as their Holby City characters, Nick Jordan and Julie Fitzjohn. Hospital director, Gary Milton (Ian Keith), also appeared in both this series and Holby City, setting up a storyline which saw the hospital threatened with closure.

Main characters 

Donna Alexander as Penny Hutchens
Jan Anderson as Chloe Hill (from episode 1)
Pal Aron as Adam Osman (from episode 1)
Ian Bleasdale as Josh Griffiths
Claire Goose as Tina Seabrook
Robert Gwilym as Max Gallagher (from episode 1)
Paterson Joseph as Mark Grace (until episode 18)
Jonathan Kerrigan as Sam Colloby
Gerald Kyd as Sean Maddox (from episode 1)
Rebecca Lacey as Georgina "George" Woodman (until episode 28)
Barbara Marten as Eve Montgomery
Vincenzo Pellegrino as Derek "Sunny" Sunderland
Cathy Shipton as Lisa "Duffy" Duffin (from episode 4)
Derek Thompson as Charlie Fairhead
Rebecca Wheatley as Amy Howard

Recurring characters 

Susan Cookson as Julie Day (episodes 1−2, from episode 20)
Ian Keith as Gary Milton (from episode 20)
Ian Kershaw as Pat Garrett (episodes 3−27)
Tobias Menzies as Frank Gallagher (episodes 7−19)
Bryan Murray as James Roberts (episodes 13−20)
Patrick Romer as Marius Petrescu (episodes 19−26)

Guest characters 

Michael French as Nick Jordan (episodes 13 and 17)
Caroline Holdaway as Eileen Rafferty (episodes 8, 12 and 26)
Kaleem Janjua as Kamal Osman (episodes 20 and 21)
Graham McTavish as Gerry Talbot (episodes 10 and 18)
Alan Rothwell as Anthony Rafferty (episodes 12 and 26)
Rosie Rowell as Pam Wilson (episodes 5−16)
Christopher Simon as Lee Anderson (episodes 13−16)
Nicola Stephenson as Julie Fitzjohn (episodes 13 and 17)

Episodes

References

External links
 Casualty series 13 at the Internet Movie Database

13
1998 British television seasons
1999 British television seasons